Old Crow Medicine Show, or sometimes known as O.C.M.S., is the first studio album released by the acoustic quintet, Old Crow Medicine Show. Songs include obscure traditional tunes and original compositions by group members. The album features their signature tune, "Wagon Wheel", written by frontman Ketch Secor using a Bob Dylan chorus. The album was produced by David Rawlings. Gillian Welch plays drums on two tracks.

Track listing

Personnel
Ketch Secor - Vocals, harmonica, fiddle, banjo
Willie Watson - Guitar, vocals, banjo
Critter Fuqua - Banjo, vocals, guitar
Kevin Hayes - Guitjo
Morgan Jahnig - Upright bass
Gillian Welch - Drums (tracks 2 & 7)
David Rawlings - Guitar (track 11)

Chart performance

Credits

The band
 Critter Fuqua - Vocals, Banjo, Guitar, Bottleneck Guitar
 Kevin Hayes - Guit-jo
 Morgan Jahnig - Upright Bass
 Ketcham Secor - Vocals, Harmonica, Fiddle, Banjo
 Willie Watson - Vocals, Guitar, Banjo

Guest musicians
 David Rawlings - Guitar on track 11
 Gillian Welch - Drums on tracks 2 and 7

Production
 David Rawlings - Producer
 Matt Andrews - Engineer
 Hank Williams - Mastering

Artwork
 Danny Clinch - Photography, Cover Photo
 Arianna Mercer - Photography

Releases

External links 
 O.C.M.S., page from the band's official web site

References 

2004 albums
Old Crow Medicine Show albums